Gaetano Castelli (born 1938) is an Italian painter and set designer.

External links 
 Gaetano Castelli website.
 
 Gaetano Castelli: The Masquerade of Souls exhibition at the Italian Cultural Institute, London, July 12, 2007 – September 13, 2007.

1938 births
Living people
Italian designers
20th-century Italian painters
20th-century Italian male artists
Italian male painters
Italian scenic designers